Franklin J. Camper (born 1946) is an American veteran, known mercenary, educator,  and writer. He has written both non-fiction and fiction books about his service in Vietnam with the 4th Infantry Division's Long Range Reconnaissance Patrol (LRRP), and also books related to military tactics and how to survive as a mercenary. Prior to becoming a writer, Camper worked for nearly two decades as a mercenary. He trained mercenaries at a school he established in Dolomite, Alabama, near Birmingham.

Background
Several newspapers and radio stations reported that Camper was involved in the Air India bombings in the 1980s, noting that he had trained one of the Sikh bombers at his mercenary school. The commando training school was located in unincorporated Jefferson County, Alabama, about 20 miles west of Dolomite. Camper said that he was not aware of the Sikh's plans although he said he was paid US$ 10,000 plus a retainer fee by an international Sikh network to produce a blueprint and a manual for terrorist strikes in India and abroad.

On May 21, 1986, Camper was arrested on suspicion of conspiring with two California women: Charlotte Wychoff and Elizabeth Leta Hamilton, to set two car bombs to kill Robyn Richoff and Harriet Russo. The attempt failed. The intended victims were disgruntled employees of Hamilton and Wychoff. Camper was sentenced to 14 years in prison for his part in the bombings.

The FBI has acknowledged that Camper was personally responsible in 1985 for saving the life of Rajiv Gandhi, India's Prime Minister. Prime Minister Gandhi was in the US on a diplomatic mission when the incident occurred.

Camper's life story was allegedly optioned for a feature film, however to date it hasn't yet been released. He is retired and lives in Birmingham, Alabama with his wife.

Publications
 The Mission (Manor Books, 1979)
 Sandcastles (Manor Books, 1980)
 Mercenary Operations Manuel (Desert Publishing, 1986)
 L.R.R.P.: The Professional (Dell Publishing, 1988)
 Merc: Professional (Dell Publishing, 1988)
 Long Range Recon Patrol (Namiki Shobo [Japan], 1990)
 Covert Operations (Ashai Sonarama [Japan], 1991)
 Special Operations (Ashai Sonarama [Japan], 1991)
 Shamal (Ashai Sonarama [Japan], 1992)
 High Seas Security (Loompanics, 1993)
 Live To Spend It: A Mercenary Guide for the 90s (Delta Press, 1994)
 The MK/Ultra Secret (Christopher Scott Publishing, 1997)
 Mindbenders (Zinn Communication, 1999)

References

1946 births
Living people
American male writers
American mercenaries
People from Jefferson County, Alabama
United States Army personnel of the Vietnam War
United States Army soldiers